WWPN may refer to:

 World Wide Port Name, in Fibre Channel storage networking technology
 WWPN (FM), an FM radio station licensed to Westernport, Maryland